The following is a list of works by Mary Cassatt that are generally accepted as autograph by the Adelyn Dohme Breeskin catalog and other sources.

Sources

 Mary Cassatt, Oils and Pastels, by E. John Bullard, Watson-Guptill Publications, New York in cooperation with the National Gallery, Washington, D.C., 1972

 
Cassatt
Cassatt, Mary